Methodist Episcopal Church South (Bethesda Heritage Church) is a historic church at 238 E. 3rd Street in Albany, Oregon.

It was built circa 1875 and added to the National Register in 1979.

References

Methodist churches in Oregon
Churches on the National Register of Historic Places in Oregon
Churches completed in 1875
National Register of Historic Places in Linn County, Oregon
Buildings and structures in Albany, Oregon
1875 establishments in Oregon